The Belgian Cup is a knockout competition for football clubs in Belgian football, organized by the Royal Belgian Football Association. It was first unofficially organized in 1908 as a tournament between teams representing the various Provinces of Belgium, with players from the various clubs reallocated into teams based on their province of origin, with the team representing West Flanders defeating the Antwerp team in the first edition final. The first club edition of the Belgian Cup occurred during the 1911–12 season.

The tournament is currently open to all clubs registered in the Belgian football league system, although clubs outside the top 5 levels, playing in the regional Belgian Provincial Leagues can only qualify through regional cup tournaments. The competition culminates at the end of the league season (usually in May) with the Belgian Cup Final, although in recent years it has sometimes taken place in March or April ahead of the end of season playoffs.

The vast majority of Belgian Cup Final matches have been in Brussels: most of these were played at the King Baudouin Stadium, which has been the location since 1996. The other venues used for the final before 1996 were the Stade Maurice Dufrasne (1994), the Constant Vanden Stock Stadium (1985, 1987, 1993 & 1995), Olympiastadion (1986 & 1992), the Stade Joseph Marien (1927 & 1935), the Stade du Vivier d'Oie (1914), the former Rue du Forest Stadium (1913) and the temporary pitch of Daring Club de Bruxelles located in Jette (1912).

As of 2022, the record for the most wins is held by Club Brugge with 11 victories. The cup has been won by the same team in two or more consecutive years on six occasions, with only Anderlecht winning consecutive finals more than once. The cup is currently held by Gent, who defeated Anderlecht in the 2022.

Results

 The "Season" column refers to the season the competition was held, and wikilinks to the article about that season.
 The wikilinks in the "Score" column point to the article about that season's final game.

Results by team
Teams shown in italics and with red background are no longer in existence.

Repeated final pairings
A total of 10 final pairings have been repeated on 16 occasions. 6 of these pairings (7 repeated occasions) have included Club Brugge as a finalist. Three of these pairings have been played more than twice. The most common final is Anderlecht v Standard Liège, having occurred on six occasions. This is also the only final pairing to have been played in consecutive seasons, and this is on three occasions. The longest span between repeated finals is Anderlecht v Club Brugge, occurring 38 years apart in 1977 and 2015.

Pairings shown in italics and with red background can no longer occur due to one or both teams no longer existing.

Notes

External links
Cofidis Cup
Belgium - List of Cup Finals, RSSSF.com

 
Belgium